Kindness Day UK is celebrated on World Kindness Day, every 13 November. Kindness Day UK is a celebration of kindness, which aims to increase the value of kindness in society as well as increase the amount of kind acts that take place, making kindness a greater part in our daily life. Kindness Day UK is affiliated with the World Kindness Movement (WKM) which is a coalition of like minded organisations containing 18 member nations. It was set up in 2010 by Louise Burfitt-Dons who founded the Cool To Be Kind anti-bullying campaign in 2001 and UK Kindness Movement in 2005 and David Jamilly who founded The Good Deeds Organisation in 2005 and went on to found Kindness UK in 2011. It is now celebrated by a range of charities, associations, businesses, schools, organisations, institutions and individuals across the UK.

Mission

Kindness Day UK and World Kindness Day are on 13 November every year and celebrated and promoted by the UK members of the World Kindness Movement. On this date the Kindness Day UK campaign's mission is to make everyone in the UK carry out an act of kindness and take a small 'pause for kindness' to value its importance. As an overall mission, the Kindness Day UK campaign aims to make kindness to people, animals and the environment a bigger part of day-to-day life in the UK.

World Kindness Day

The date decreed for World Kindness Day is 13 November. This was the opening day of the first World Kindness Movement conference held at Tokyo in 1998, and the 35th anniversary of the Small Kindness Movement of Japan

Presence in popular culture

Kindness Day has received a great amount of support from celebrities, enterprise, politicians and religious leaders. Supporters include Dame Barbara Stocking DBE, former Chief Executive of Oxfam, The Rt HON Sir John Major KG CH, Russell Brand, Holly Willoughby, Sir Stuart Rose, Chairman of Marks and Spencer, The Rt Hon David Blunkett, Gary Lineker, Sir Alex Ferguson, Vanessa Feltz, Camilla Dallerup, Peter Snow, Jo Brand, Billy Murray, Patsy Kensit, Alan Titchmarsh, Brian Blessed, Jilly Cooper, Noel Edmonds, Charles Kennedy MP, Arlene Phillips, Ruby Wax and Monica Cafferky.

See also
World Kindness Day
Random Acts of Kindness
Kindness
Random Acts of Kindness Day
Cool To Be Kind
 Center for Sex Positive Culture
 Positive psychology
 Culture and positive psychology
 Positive youth development
 Positive education

References

External links
Kindness Day UK

2010 establishments in the United Kingdom
Recurring events established in 2010
Kindness